The City Assembly of Belgrade is the legislature of the City of Belgrade, capital of Serbia. It is a representative body that executes the essential functions of the local government stipulated by the legislation and the City Charter.

Composition and conveying
The City Assembly consists of 110 councilors elected at the local election for the four years’ term. The City Assembly gets together according to circumstances, and at least once in three months.

Leadership

President
The President of the City Assembly, summons sessions, suggests the agenda and presides over the City Assembly sessions, looks after implementing of the transparency of work of the City Assembly, signs bylaws adopted by the City Assembly and performs any other operations entrusted by the City Assembly. The City Assembly elects the President and Deputy President from the complement of the councilors for the four years’ term.

The current President of the City Assembly is Nikola Nikodijević, while Andrea Radulović is the Deputy President of the City Assembly.

Secretary
The Secretary of the City Assembly looks after the performance of professional operations in connection with convening and holding of sessions of the City Assembly and its working bodies, and manages administrative affairs related to their work. The City Assembly appoints the Secretary and Deputy Secretary of the City Assembly at the proposal of the President of the City Assembly, for four years. The current Secretary of the City Assembly is Biiljana Živković, while Vukica Lončar is the Deputy Secretary of the City Assembly.

Authorities (competences)
Adoption of the City Charter and deciding on its amendments;
Bringing of decisions and other bylaws and providing authentic interpretation of those decisions and bylaws;
Adopting of the program of the City development and certain activities, as well as the regional physical plan and urban development plans;
Adopting of the City budget and annual financial report;
Founding of public enterprises, public services, and participating in the foundation of enterprises of interest to the City;
Deciding on construction, maintenance, and use of streets, squares, and other public buildings/facilities of importance to the City;
Deciding on taking loans for the City and on flotation of a City bond issue of the City, as well as on investments of the City funds;
Calling of the City referendum, deciding on the proposals contained by public initiatives, and specifying a draft decision on voluntary local taxes;
Adopting of the ground rules of protection, use, and melioration of the agricultural land and looking after their implementation;
Adopting of the annual program of acquiring real estates necessary to meet the needs of the City bodies and City Administration, further to the approval of the Government of the Republic of Serbia;
Consisting of the City Administration, services, and other organizations of interest to the City;
Electing and relieving of the Chairperson and Deputy Chairperson of the Assembly, chairpersons and members of working bodies of the Assembly;
Appointing and relieving of the Secretary of the Assembly and his/her deputy;
Electing and relieving of members of the City Council further to the Mayor’s proposal;
Nominating and relieving of the Steering and the Auditing Committees, appointing and relieving of the directors of the organizations it is the founder of, and issuing of approvals on their bylaws, in compliance with the legislation;
Deciding on awarding the title of the honorary citizen of Belgrade, the Plaque of the City of Belgrade, and other public awards;
Appointing and relieving of the Head of the City Administration and his/her deputy, further to a proposal of the Mayor;
Giving of the opinion on the legislation that stipulate issues of the interests to the local self-government;
Bringing about the procedure for protecting of rights of the local self-government before the Constitutional Court;
Issuing of the approval on using names, coat of arms and/or other symbols of the City;
Deciding on the membership in the national and international organizations of cities/towns;
Adopting of the rules of procedure on its work, and
Carrying out of other operations in accordance with the legislation and City Charter.

Working bodies
The members of the working bodies (councils and commissions) are elected by the Assembly from the complement of the councilors, at the proposal of councilors’ groups and proportionally to the number of councilors they have in the City Assembly.

Latest election results
The following are results of the 2022 election:

Previous election was held in 2018.

See also
Mayor of Belgrade

Footnotes

Government of Belgrade